Rhododendron decorum, the great white rhododendron is a species of flowering plant in the heath family Ericaceae. Flowers are borne in trusses, white to pale pink, with a yellow throat, large and very fragrant.

It was first described by French botanist Adrien René Franchet in 1886.

In cultivation in the UK, Rhododendron decorum  has gained the Royal Horticultural Society’s Award of Garden Merit. It is hardy down to  but requires a sheltered position and an acid soil that is rich in leaf mould.

Lower taxa 
Rhododendron decorum subsp. cordatum W. K. Hu
Rhododendron decorum subsp. decorum (Batalin) H. Hara
Rhododendron decorum subsp. diaprepes (I. B. Balfour & W. W. Smith) T. L. Ming
Rhododendron decorum subsp. parvistigmatis W. K. Hu

References

 "Rhododendron decorum", Franchet, Bull. Soc. Bot. France. 33: 230. 1886.

decorum